Hjortekær is a neighbourhood in Lyngby-Taarbæk Municipality, in the Region Hovedstaden. It is located north of Fortunen, east of Lundtofte and west of Jægersborg Dyrehave. The Technical University of Denmark has used localities in Hjortekær for surveying education since 1890.

References 

Cities and towns in the Capital Region of Denmark
Copenhagen metropolitan area
Neighbourhoods in Denmark
Lyngby-Taarbæk Municipality